The Rensselaer Engineers represent Rensselaer Polytechnic Institute. The Engineers are playing their fourth season in ECAC Hockey. The Engineers are coached by John Burke, and he is the Engineers all-time winningest coach (118-82-21). He is in his seventh season as head coach. His assistant coaches are Colette Bredin-Youlen and Rob Dils. Kevin Anderson is the Hockey Operations Coordinator. The Engineers play their home games in the Houston Field House. They are a member of the Eastern College Athletic Conference and will attempt to win the NCAA Women's Ice Hockey Championship. During the season, the team won 16 games. It is the second highest mark in school history since joining Division 1. The record is still 19 wins, which was set in 2008-09 (19-14-4). Rensselaer is 16-14-6 overall and finished with an 11-7-4 mark in ECAC Hockey. The Engineers rank 11th nationally in scoring defense (2.00 goals allowed per game).

Offseason
May 12: Rensselaer Polytechnic Institute (RPI) head announced that seven student-athletes will make up the program's Class of 2013. Joining the team this fall are:

Exhibition

Regular season
February 17: Laura Gersten and Sonja van der Bliek are among 45 nominees for the Patty Kazmaier Memorial Award.

Standings

Roster

Schedule

Player stats
Allison Wright leads all players in scoring with 25 points (12 goals, 13 assists) after 36 games played. Currently, she leads the Engineers in game-winning goals with three. Whitney Naslund ranks second in team scoring with 24 points (team-best 14 goals, 10 assists). Sophomore center Alisa Harrison ranks third with 23 points (12 goals, 11 assists). Naslund and Harrison have played in all 36 games for the Engineers.

Skaters

Goaltenders
In goal, junior Sonja van der Bliek has a 15-14-5 overall record. She is now the all-time career record holder at RPI in six categories, including wins (42-31-11), games played (84), games started (83), minutes played (5161:36), saves (1922) and shutouts (16).

Postseason
 On February 28, Rensselaer made NCAA history. The Engineers beat Quinnipiac, 2-1, but it took five overtimes. It is now the longest college hockey game in NCAA history. Senior defenseman Laura Gersten had the game-winning goal. She registered it at 4:32 of the fifth overtime session to not only clinch the win, but the series victory. RPI advanced to the ECAC Hockey Women's Semifinals for the second consecutive season. The Engineers will face top ranked Cornell University.

Of note, Sonja van der Bliek stopped 98 of the 101 shots as RPI triumphed in a best two out of three playoff series against Quinnipiac. She allowed only three goals while appearing in 293:18 minutes. For the weekend, she posted a goals against average of 0.61. She registered 49 saves on Sunday, February 28 as RPI defeated the Bobcats, in five overtimes. The match was the longest game in NCAA hockey history. This was the fifth Goaltender of the Week honor for van der Bliek in her NCAA career.

Awards and honors
 Laura Gersten, Sarah Devens Award
 Sonja van der Bliek was named the ECAC Goaltender of the Week (for the week of March 1, 2010) 
 Allison Wright is a nominee to participate in the 2010 Frozen Four Skills Challenge in April
 Allison Wright, finalist for the 2009-10 ECAC Women's Best Defensive Forward Award

See also
2010–11 RPI Engineers women's ice hockey season

References

External links
Official site

Rpi
RPI Engineers women's ice hockey seasons
RPI
RPI